Musa Aydın (born 1 November 1980 in Samsun) is a former Turkish footballer.

At the start of the 2009–10 season, he scored a Champions League goal for Sivasspor against Anderlecht in the second leg of the third round qualifying, in a game that Sivas won 3–1.

References

External links

1980 births
Living people
Turkish footballers
Samsunspor footballers
Sakaryaspor footballers
Sivasspor footballers
Bucaspor footballers
Antalyaspor footballers
Süper Lig players
TFF First League players
Association football midfielders